The Grand prix du roman métis is a French literary award established in 2010 by the city of Saint-Denis-de-La Réunion. It rewards a French-language novel published less than a year ago and which emphasizes the values of multiracialism, multiculturalism and humanism. The institution also awards each year the Prix du roman métis des lycéens and the Prix du roman métis des lecteurs de la ville de Saint-Denis. Each prize is worth 5000 euros.

Jury 
The jury comes from the book world and includes the winners of the previous year’s award.

List of winners

Grand prix du roman métis

Prix du roman métis des lycéens

Prix du roman métis des lecteurs de la ville de Saint-Denis

Special mentions 
 2018 : Jury special mention for Un océan, deux mers, trois continents by Wilfried N'Sondé, Actes Sud
 2019 : Jury special mention for Là où les chiens aboient par la queue by Estelle-Sarah Bulle, éditions Liana Levi.

References

External links 
 La Réunion des livres

French literary awards
Awards established in 2010
French-language literary awards